Dietlind Tiemann (born 30 August 1955) is a German politician of the Christian Democratic Union (CDU) who served as a member of the Bundestag from the state of Brandenburg from 2017–2021.

Political career 
Tiemann became a member of the Bundestag in the 2017 German federal election. In parliament, she served on the Finance Committee and the Committee on Education, Research and Technology Assessment.

In the 2021 German federal election, Tiemann failed to defend her seat, losing it to Social Democratic Party candidate Sonja Eichwede.

Political positions 
Ahead of the Christian Democrats’ leadership election in 2021, Tiemann publicly endorsed Friedrich Merz to succeed Annegret Kramp-Karrenbauer as the party’s chair.

References

External links 

  
 Bundestag biography 

1955 births
Living people
Members of the Bundestag for Brandenburg
Female members of the Bundestag
21st-century German women politicians
Members of the Bundestag 2017–2021
Members of the Bundestag for the Christian Democratic Union of Germany